is a 2014 Japanese-South Korean thriller film directed by Kōji Shiraishi. It was released on 6 September 2014 in Japan, and 11 September 2014 in South Korea.

Cast
Yeon Je-wook as Park Sang-joon
Kim Kkot-bi as Kim So-yeon
Tsukasa Aoi as Tsukasa
Ryotaro Yonemura
Park Jeong-yoon as Go Yoon-jin 
Yeo Min-jeong 
Kōji Shiraishi as Tashiro, cameraman

References

External links
 

2010s thriller films
2014 films
Films directed by Kōji Shiraishi
Japanese thriller films
South Korean thriller films
2010s Japanese films
2010s South Korean films